A development girl or D-girl is a derogatory Hollywood slang term for non-influential, entry-level staff members in a film production company. Responsibilities include finding and identifying story ideas worthy of adaptation into a script and writing script coverage for scripts submitted to the production company. The job title is gender neutral – according to Los Angeles Times, probably a quarter of d-girls are men.

References 

Film production
Pejorative terms for women
Slang terms for people